Tesaro Inc. is a pharmaceutical company based in Waltham, Massachusetts. They focus on drug development for cancer.

History
Tesaro was founded in 2010. The company's first commercial product, Varubi, was approved by the FDA in October 2015.  As of 2016, the company had 286 full-time employees, 59 of whom had a PhD or MD. The company's product Niraparib was granted priority review and was given a target action date of June 2017 by the FDA. In March 2017, Tesaro won approval for its drug Zejula to treat ovarian cancer. On May 31, 2017, it was reported that Tesaro Inc. was exploring a sale. On December 3, 2018, GSK announced it would acquire the company for $5.1 billion, and the deal was completed on January 22, 2019.

Products under development
 Rolapitant – intravenous form in phase III clinical trials for use in chemotherapy-induced nausea and vomiting
 Niraparib – PARP inhibitor in clinical trials for breast and ovarian cancer.
 TSR-042
 TSR-022

References

External links
 

Pharmaceutical companies of the United States
Health care companies based in Massachusetts
Companies based in Waltham, Massachusetts
Pharmaceutical companies established in 2010
2010 establishments in Massachusetts
2012 initial public offerings
2019 mergers and acquisitions
Companies formerly listed on the Nasdaq
American subsidiaries of foreign companies
GSK plc